Stipa capillata is a perennial bunchgrass species in the family Poaceae, native to Europe and Asia.

References 
 GrassBase entry
 
 Sp. pl. ed. 2, 1:116. 1762

External links

capillata
Bunchgrasses of Europe
Bunchgrasses of Asia
Grasses of India
Flora of Europe
Flora of Western Asia
Flora of Central Asia
Flora of China
Flora of Mongolia